Pescucci is a surname. Notable people with the surname include:

Gabriella Pescucci (born 1943), Italian costume designer
Gastone Pescucci (1926–1999), Italian actor and voice actor

See also
Pascucci (surname)

Italian-language surnames